Giovanni Giacomo Borni (1635 – 29 October 1700) was an Italian painter of the Baroque period, active in Lombardy in towns near the province of Brescia, including Saviore dell'Adamello. He is also referred in local documents as Gian Giacomo Gaioni or Gajoni detto il Bate or Bornibatte. Also known as Giacomo Borno. His early mentors are unknown. He married Margherita Gelmini from Ponte in 1659 and had about a half dozen children. He died in Ponte.
 
Local painting styles that may have influenced him include Jacopo da Palma il Giovane, Giuseppe Nuvolone (son of Panfilo), Grazio Cossali, Girolamo Romanino, Girolamo Savoldo, and il Moretto.

References
 Valsaviore town homepage.

1635 births
1700 deaths
17th-century Italian painters
Italian male painters
18th-century Italian painters
Painters from Brescia
Italian Baroque painters
18th-century Italian male artists